The keel is the bottom-most longitudinal structural element on a vessel. On some sailboats, it may have a hydrodynamic and counterbalancing purpose, as well. The laying of the keel is often the initial step in the construction of a ship. In the British and American shipbuilding traditions, this event marks the beginning date of a ships construction.

Etymology
The word "keel" comes from Old English , Old Norse , = "ship" or "keel". It has the distinction of being regarded by some scholars as the first word in the English language recorded in writing, having been recorded by Gildas in his 6th century Latin work De Excidio et Conquestu Britanniae, under the spelling cyulae (he was referring to the three ships that the Saxons first arrived in).

 is the Latin word for "keel" and is the origin of the term careen (to clean a keel and the hull in general, often by rolling the ship on its side). An example of this use is Careening Cove, a suburb of Sydney, Australia, where careening was carried out in early colonial days.

Structural keels
A structural keel is the bottom-most structural member around which the hull of a ship is built. The keel runs along the centerline of the ship, from the bow to the stern.  The keel is often the first part of a ship's hull to be constructed, and laying the keel, or placing the keel in the cradle in which the ship will be built may mark the start time of its construction. Large, modern ships are now often built in a series of pre-fabricated, complete hull sections rather than being built around a single keel, so the shipbuilding process commences with the cutting of the first sheet of steel.

The most common type of keel is the "flat plate keel", and this is fitted in the majority of ocean-going ships and other vessels. A form of keel found on smaller vessels is the "bar keel", which may be fitted in trawlers, tugs, and smaller ferries. Where grounding is possible, this type of keel is suitable with its massive scantlings, but there is always a problem of the increased draft with no additional cargo capacity. If a double bottom is fitted, the keel is almost inevitably of the flat plate type, bar keels often being associated with open floors, where the plate keel may also be fitted.

Hydrodynamic keels
Hydrodynamic keels have the primary purpose of interacting with the water and are typical of certain sailboats. Fixed hydrodynamic keels have the structural strength to support the weight of the boat.

Sailboat keels
In sailboats, keels serve two purposes: 1) as an underwater foil to minimize the lateral motion of the vessel under sail (leeway) and 2) as a counterweight to the lateral force of the wind on the sail(s) that causes rolling to the side (heeling). As an underwater foil, a keel uses the forward motion of the boat to generate lift to counteract the leeward force of the wind. Related foils include centerboards and daggerboards, which do not have the secondary purpose of being a counterweight. As counterweight, a keel increasingly offsets the heeling moment with increasing angle of heel.

Moveable sailboat keels may pivot (a swing keel), retract upwards (retracting keel), or swing sideways in the water (canting keels) to move the ballasting effect to one side and allow the boat to sail in a more upright position.

See also
 Coin ceremony
 Kelson
 False keel
 Daggerboard
 Leeboard
 Bilgeboard
 Bruce foil
 Keelhauling – an archaic maritime punishment

Notes

Bibliography

 Rousmaniere, John, The Annapolis Book of Seamanship, Simon & Schuster, 1999
 Chapman Book of Piloting (various contributors), Hearst Corporation, 1999
 Herreshoff, Halsey (consulting editor), The Sailor’s Handbook, Little Brown and Company
 Seidman, David, The Complete Sailor, International Marine, 1995
 Jobson, Gary, Sailing Fundamentals, Simon & Schuster, 1987

Nautical terminology
Naval architecture
Sailing rigs and rigging
Sailing vessel components
Shipbuilding
Sailboat components